Victoria is a Mexican telenovela produced by Ernesto Alonso for Televisa in 1987. Its original story of Luis Reyes de la Maza, was adapted by Tere Medina and directed by Alfredo Gurrola.

Victoria Ruffo and Juan Ferrara starred as protagonists.

Plot
This telenovela tells the adventures of Victoria a foreign girl who comes to Mexico with the aim of finding a husband, clearly these situations are rare with a dose of melodrama and comedy that gave freshness to the story, despite not being a success equaled the success of the original, this according to critics of the lack of independence between one and the other because they were exactly alike.

Cast 
Victoria Ruffo as Victoria Martínez Medina
Juan Ferrara as Juan Alfonso de los Santos
Isabela Corona as Montserrat Williams de de los Santos
Roberto Vander as Reinaldo "Ray"
Gina Romand as Anabel de Santana
Gabriela Ruffo as Carmenza Martínez
Guillermo Murray as Leonel de los Santos
Rosario Gálvez as Sara Williams y Montero
Marco Muñoz as Guillermo
Raymundo Capetillo as Joaquín de los Santos
Rebeca Silva as Carmina Rodríguez
Emilia Carranza as Amelia Espinosa de los Reyes
Miguel Manzano as Jeremías
Xavier Marc as Gerardo de los Santos
Miguel Macía as Teodoro Jerez
Oscar Servin as Pascual
Flor Trujillo as Lucía de los Santos
Aurora Alonso as Bertha
Yolanda Ciani as Verónica Moguel Oliva
Raquel Pankowsky as Hortensia
Cecilia Gabriela as Eloisa
Alicia Montoya as Esperanza
Luis Aguilar as Gregorio Estrada
Luis Xavier as Mario Moguel Oliva
Roberto D'Amico as Miguel Santana
Toño Infante as Aurelio
Martha Resnikoff as Soledad
Sergio Suani as Felipe
Consuelo Frank as Doña Gabriela Oliva
Lucy Cantú as Minerva
Guillermo Aguilar as Rodolfo
Irma Infante as Virginia
Romina Castro as Cristina de la Peña

Awards

References

External links

1987 telenovelas
Mexican telenovelas
1987 Mexican television series debuts
1988 Mexican television series endings
Spanish-language telenovelas
Television shows set in Mexico
Televisa telenovelas